The 2011 Abierto Mexicano Telcel was a professional tennis tournament played on clay courts. It was the 18th edition of the men's tournament (11th for the women), which was part of the 2011 ATP World Tour and the 2011 WTA Tour. It took place in Acapulco, Mexico between 21 and 26 February 2011.

ATP entrants

Seeds

 Rankings are as of February 14, 2011.

Other entrants
The following players received wildcards into the singles main draw:
  Daniel Garza
  Santiago González
  Manuel Sánchez

The following entrant has been granted a Special Exemption into the main draw:
  Milos Raonic (withdrew)

The following players received entry from the qualifying draw:

  Paul Capdeville
  Máximo González
  Albert Ramos Viñolas
  Adrian Ungur

The following players received entry as lucky losers into the singles main draw:
  Frederico Gil (for Nalbandian)
  Horacio Zeballos (for Robredo)
  Daniel Muñoz de la Nava (for Raonic)
  Iván Navarro (for Riba)

WTA entrants

Seeds

 Rankings are as of February 14, 2011.

Other entrants
The following players received wildcards into the singles main draw:
  Ximena Hermoso
  Karolína Plíšková
  Kristýna Plíšková

The following players received entry from the qualifying draw:

  Mădălina Gojnea
  Sílvia Soler Espinosa
  Anna Tatishvili
  Lesia Tsurenko

Finals

Men's singles

 David Ferrer defeated  Nicolás Almagro, 7–6(7–4), 6–7(2–7), 6–2
It was Ferrer's 2nd title of the year and 11th of his career. It was his 2nd consecutive win at the event.

Women's singles

 Gisela Dulko defeated  Arantxa Parra Santonja, 6–3, 7–6(7–5)
 It was Dulko's first title of the year and fourth of her career.

Men's doubles

 Victor Hănescu /  Horia Tecău defeated  Marcelo Melo /  Bruno Soares, 6–1, 6–3

Women's doubles

 Mariya Koryttseva /  Ioana Raluca Olaru defeated  Lourdes Domínguez Lino /  Arantxa Parra Santonja, 3–6, 6–1, [10–4]

References

External links
Official Website
ATP official site

 
2011
Abierto Mexicano Telcel
Abierto Mexicano Telcel
2011 in Mexican tennis
February 2011 sports events in Mexico